Sage 50  is a set of accountancy and payroll products developed by Sage Group aimed at small and medium enterprises. Sage offer different products under the Sage 50 name in different regions. The product name originally derives from the UK and Ireland version of the product where the number 50 indicated that it was aimed at companies with up to 50 employees. The products are described as cloud-connected reflecting the remote working and online capabilities of the range.

UK/Ireland version 
In the UK and Ireland there are currently four products under the Sage 50 banner; Accounts, Payroll, HR and P11D. Sage 50 Accounts was the market-leading accounting solution for many years.

The product currently known as Sage 50 Accounts has its origins in some of the earliest solutions that Sage produced. A direct relative of the current product is the Sage Sterling range which became available in September 1989 as a replacement for Sage's successful Businesswise Accounts range. Sage Sterling was available for DOS and in the early 1990s for Microsoft Windows. The product was re-branded as Sage Sterling +2 and in 1993 a version of the product became available for Apple Macintosh. By 1993 Sage Sterling was market leader having accounted for 62.5% of the integrated accounting software market. In the late 1990s, Sage Instant, a cut-down version of the product line was introduced.

Later, the product was rebranded as Sage Line 50, a reference to the target market of the product, and in the 2000s was rebranded to simply Sage 50. In the 2010s cloud-connected functionality was added to the product line and the 50c and 50cloud name began to be used as part of the wider Sage Business Cloud portfolio of products. In 2023 the product branding was simplified again back to Sage 50. The UK/Ireland Sage 50 products are developed in Newcastle upon Tyne, England.

US version 

The US version of the product was previously called Peachtree Accounting. A conversion to the Peachtree/Sage 50 data format was made available when Simply Accounting was taken off the market. In 2013 it was brought under the Sage 50 banner.

Peachtree Accounting was originally sold by a software publisher founded in Atlanta in 1978 by Ben Dyer, Ron Roberts, Steve Mann, and John Hayes. The company was carved out of The Computersystem Center, an early Altair dealer founded by Roberts, Mann, Jim Dunion, and Rich Stafford, which Dyer had joined as the manager and where its first software was published in 1977. Peachtree was the first successful business software made for microcomputers, supplanting the General Ledger programmed with CBASIC and distributed by Structured Systems Group. It is the oldest microcomputer computer program for business in current use.
The company expanded its offerings with its acquisition of Layered, an accounting program designed for use on the Macintosh. The company's products were included in the initial launch of the IBM Personal Computer, and it was acquired by Management Science America (MSA) in June 1981.

By early 1984 InfoWorld estimated that Peachtree was the world's seventh-largest microcomputer-software company, with $21.7 million in 1983 sales. After several subsequent changes of ownership ending with ADP, Peachtree was eventually acquired by the Sage Group in 1998 for  million. 

In the US, many schools utilize this program in their Accounting classes.

Canadian version 
The Canadian version of Sage 50 was previously known as Bedford Accounting and later renamed to Simply Accounting. In 2013 it was brought under the Sage 50 banner.

Bedford Software developed Bedford Integrated Accounting for DOS in 1985 and for Macintosh in 1988, then naming it Simply Accounting. Bedford Software was acquired by Computer Associates in 1989. Simply Accounting became an Independent Business Unit of Computer Associates in 1996 and subsequently incorporated as  ACCPAC International, Inc. in 1998. ACCPAC was acquired by The Sage Group in 2004 for integration with its ERP products. It is developed in Richmond, British Columbia.

French version 
The French version of the product, known as Sage 50 Ciel, was originally developed by Ciel, the French software business, founded in 1986 that Sage acquired in 1992.

German/Austrian version 
The Austrian and German versions of the product were formerly known as Sage GS-Office. It came under the Sage 50 banner in 2015.

Polish version 
The Polish version of the product was known as Sage Symfonia 50, until it was acquired by Mid Europa Partners in 2021 and rebranded as Symfonia.

Spanish version 
The Spanish version of the product was formerly known as Sage ContaPlus. First offered in the early 1980s by Grupo SP, it gained incredible popularity in 1990 by using news stands as point of sale and was offered at very low prices at a time where professional accounting was very expensive. ContaPlus also took advantage of the Spanish accounting reform of 1990. Nowadays, ContaPlus is the "accounting standard" in Spain with more than one million customers. Grupo SP was purchased by Sage in 2003.

South African version 
South African version, Sage 50 Pastel, was formerly known as Pastel Accounting and has been available since 1989. The product was initially developed by Pastel Software who were purchased by Softline in 1999. The product then became known as Softline Pastel. Sage acquired Softline in 2003 and the product eventually became known as Sage Pastel and later Sage 50 Pastel. It is widely used in industry, with job advertisements frequently requiring proficiency in the software, and training courses are available by third-party providers.

References

External links
 Sage 50 Accounting US
 Sage 50 Accounting Canada
 Sage 50 Accounts UK

Accounting software
50